Mitogen-activated protein kinase kinase kinase 13 is an enzyme that in humans is encoded by the MAP3K13 gene.

Function 

The protein encoded by this gene is a member of serine/threonine protein kinase family. This kinase contains a dual leucine-zipper motif, and has been shown to form dimers/oligomers through its leucine-zipper motif. This kinase can phosphorylate and activate MAPK8/JNK, MAP2K7/MKK7, which suggests a role in the JNK signaling pathway.

Interactions 

MAP3K13 has been shown to interact with PRDX3.

References

Further reading 

 
 
 
 
 

EC 2.7.11